In geometry, the relation of hyperbolic orthogonality between two lines separated by the asymptotes of a hyperbola is a concept used in special relativity to define simultaneous events. Two events will be simultaneous when they are on a line hyperbolically orthogonal to a particular time line. This dependence on a certain time line is determined by velocity, and is the basis for the relativity of simultaneity.

Geometry
Two lines are hyperbolic orthogonal when they are reflections of each other over the asymptote of a given hyperbola.
Two particular hyperbolas are frequently used in the plane:

The relation of hyperbolic orthogonality actually applies to classes of parallel lines in the plane, where any particular line can represent the class. Thus, for a given hyperbola and asymptote A, a pair of lines (a, b) are hyperbolic orthogonal if there is a pair (c, d) such that , and c is the reflection of d across A.

Similar to the perpendularity of a circle radius to the tangent, a radius to a hyperbola is hyperbolic orthogonal to a tangent to the hyperbola.

A bilinear form is used to describe orthogonality in analytic geometry, with two elements orthogonal when their bilinear form vanishes.
The vectors z1 and z2 in the complex number plane, and w1 and w2 in the hyperbolic number plane are said to be respectively Euclidean orthogonal or hyperbolic orthogonal if their respective inner products [bilinear forms] are zero.

The bilinear form may be computed as the real part of the complex product of one number with the conjugate of the other. Then
 entails perpendicularity in the complex plane, while
 implies the ws are hyperbolic orthogonal.

When a = b the ellipse is a circle and the conjugate diameters are perpendicular while the hyperbola is rectangular and the conjugate diameters are hyperbolic-orthogonal.

In the terminology of projective geometry, the operation of taking the hyperbolic orthogonal line is an involution. Suppose the slope of a vertical line is denoted ∞ so that all lines have a slope in the projectively extended real line. Then whichever hyperbola (A) or (B) is used, the operation is an example of a hyperbolic involution where the asymptote is invariant. Hyperbolically orthogonal lines lie in different sectors of the plane, determined by the asymptotes of the hyperbola, thus the relation of hyperbolic orthogonality is a heterogeneous relation on sets of lines in the plane.

Simultaneity
Since Hermann Minkowski's foundation for spacetime study in 1908, the concept of points in a spacetime plane being hyperbolic-orthogonal to a timeline (tangent to a world line) has been used to define simultaneity''' of events relative to the timeline, or relativity of simultaneity. In Minkowski's development the hyperbola of type (B) above is in use.

When  = 1 and the s and s are zero,  ≠ 0,  ≠ 0, then .

Given a hyperbola with asymptote A, its reflection in A produces the conjugate hyperbola. Any diameter of the original hyperbola is reflected to a conjugate diameter. The directions indicated by conjugate diameters are taken for space and time axes in relativity.
As E. T. Whittaker wrote in 1910, "[the] hyperbola is unaltered when any pair of conjugate diameters are taken as new axes, and a new unit of length is taken proportional to the length of either of these diameters." On this principle of relativity, he then wrote the Lorentz transformation in the modern form using rapidity.

Edwin Bidwell Wilson and Gilbert N. Lewis developed the concept within synthetic geometry in 1912. They note "in our plane no pair of perpendicular [hyperbolic-orthogonal] lines is better suited to serve as coordinate axes than any other pair"

References

 G. D. Birkhoff (1923) Relativity and Modern Physics, pages 62,3, Harvard University Press.
 Francesco Catoni, Dino Boccaletti, & Roberto Cannata (2008) Mathematics of Minkowski Space, Birkhäuser Verlag, Basel. See page 38, Pseudo-orthogonality.
 Robert Goldblatt (1987) Orthogonality and Spacetime Geometry'', chapter 1: A Trip on Einstein's Train, Universitext Springer-Verlag  
 

Minkowski spacetime
Angle